Morgan Geekie (born July 20, 1998) is a Canadian ice hockey centre currently playing for the  Seattle Kraken of the National Hockey League (NHL).

Personal life
Geekie was born on July 20, 1998, Strathclair, Manitoba to parents Craig and Tobi. Geekie was born into an athletic family with his father and brothers all playing the same sport. His father played with the Brandon Wheat Kings and Spokane Chiefs before turning to coaching while his brother Noah played AAA hockey before switching to baseball. Likewise, his other brother Conor currently plays for the Winnipeg Ice and was drafted in the first round, 11th overall, by the Arizona Coyotes in the 2022 NHL Entry Draft.

Playing career

Amateur
Growing up in Manitoba, Geekie played youth hockey with the Yellowhead Chiefs of the Manitoba U-18 'AAA' Hockey League (MMHL). In his rookie season, Geekie led the team with 53 points through 44 games and was subsequently named a Second Team All-Star in addition to Player of the Week, Rookie of the Week, and Offensive Player of the Month. Following his outstanding season, Geekie signed a contract with the Tri-City Americans of the Western Hockey League (WHL). He subsequently joined the Americans for their final regular-season game, where he scored the teams' only goal in an eventual 6–1 loss.

Geekie returned to the Yellowhead Chiefs for the majority of the 2014–15 season while also playing two games with the Neepawa Titans of the Manitoba Junior Hockey League (MJHL). On January 8, 2015, Geekie was named a First-Team All-Star in the MMHL after he tallied 44 points in 29 games to lead the league in scoring. Geekie finished the season with new career-highs with 27 goals and 36 assists for 63 points through 44 games.

Major junior

Following another successful junior season, Geekie began his first full major junior campaign in the 2015–16 season. He had a strong rookie season where he scored 12 goals and 25 points through 66 games. However, he was passed over in his first year of draft eligibility and returned to the Americans for his sophomore season. Geekie exploded offensively in the 2016–17 season and tallied a career-best 90 points through 72 games. He subsequently earned a final ranking of 42 amongst North American skaters by the NHL Central Scouting Bureau. When speaking of his success, Geekie pointed towards his increased confidence as a player being the major contributing factor. In June 2017, he was one of two players drafted by the Carolina Hurricanes in the third round of the 2017 NHL Entry Draft. Following the draft, he participated in the Hurricanes' Development Camp prior to the start of the 2017–18 season.

In his final junior hockey campaign, Geekie tallied 84 points in the regular season as he helped the Americans qualify for the Western Conference finals. Through 14 playoff games, Geekie scored 17 goals and 10 assists to finish sixth in playoff scoring. He also tallied four game-winning goals which were tied for first with Glenn Gawdin and Giorgio Estephan.

Professional
Following the American's elimination from the playoffs, Geekie signed an Amateur Tryout Agreement with the Hurricanes American Hockey League (AHL), the Charlotte Checkers, for the remainder of their regular season. On May 10, 2018, Geekie signed a three-year, entry-level contract with the Carolina Hurricanes. After attending the Hurricanes' training camp, Geekie was re-assigned to the Checkers for the 2018–19 season. In his first full professional season, Geekie helped the team win their first Calder Cup during the 2019 Calder Cup playoffs.

On March 7, 2020, Geekie was called up to the Hurricanes and made his NHL debut the following day against the Pittsburgh Penguins. In his NHL debut, he recorded two goals and an assist in the 6–2 win. On March 10, 2020 Geekie scored his third goal on only the third shot of his NHL career.

On July 16, 2021, Geekie signed a one year contract extension to remain with the Hurricanes. However, a few days later, Geekie was selected from the Hurricanes at the 2021 NHL Expansion Draft by the Seattle Kraken. In the Kraken's inaugural  season, Geekie established himself in a regular top-nine forward role, and responded in setting career highs with 7 goals and 15 assists for 22 points in 73 regular season games.

As a restricted free agent in the off-season, Geekie filed for arbitration before settling to a one-year, $1.4 millon contract extension with the Kraken on July 24, 2022.

Career statistics

Regular season and playoffs

International

Awards and honours

References

External links
 

1998 births
Canadian ice hockey centres
Carolina Hurricanes draft picks
Carolina Hurricanes players
Charlotte Checkers (2010–) players
Chicago Wolves players
Ice hockey people from Manitoba
Living people
Neepawa Natives players
Seattle Kraken players
Tri-City Americans players